Events in the year 2018 in Eritrea.

Incumbents 
 President: Isaias Afewerki

Events

8 to 9 July – The 2018 Eritrea–Ethiopia summit took place in Asmara, between Eritrean President Isaias Afwerki and Ethiopian Prime Minister Abiy Ahmed and officials from the two countries.

Sports 
9 to 25 February – Eritrea participated at the 2018 Winter Olympics in PyeongChang, South Korea, with 1 competitor in 1 sport; this was the first time Eritrea took part in the Winter Olympics.

Deaths

24 May – Tsehaytu Beraki, musician, poet and political activist (b. 1939).

References

 
2010s in Eritrea 
Years of the 21st century in Eritrea 
Eritrea 
Eritrea